Hanna K. is a 1983 American drama film directed by Costa-Gavras, starring Jill Clayburgh and Gabriel Byrne. The film was an attempt to depict the Palestinian-Israeli conflict in human terms.

Plot
Hanna K. is the story of Hanna Kaufman, a child of Holocaust survivors and an American-Jewish immigrant to Israel, who is a court-appointed lawyer assigned to defend a Palestinian, Salim Bakri, accused of terrorism and infiltration. Salim claims that he was trying to regain possession of his family house. Hanna saves him from a jail sentence, but he is deported to Jordan. Salim eventually returns, is jailed for illegal immigration, and he again asks for her services. Hanna investigates the story and discovered that Salim's family home is now a tourist attraction in Kafr Rimon, a settlement built and lived in by Russian Jews. Bakri's former village of Kufr Rumaneh has disappeared except for a few stones and trees.

The state's attorneys offer Hanna a deal: if she drops the proceedings, they will arrange for Salim to become a South African citizen, and he can then return to Israel and try to get his property back.  Hanna is confronted with the fact that one legacy of the Holocaust was the dispossession of the Palestinians while her colleagues attempt to persuade her of the merits of the arrangement for Salim with the argument that Israel must be "defended" even if Palestinians are denied their rights.

Reception and controversy
Pro-Israeli groups were concerned about the film's sympathetic depiction of the Palestinian issue. An internal memorandum was circulated by a B'nai B'rith advising members about arguments which can be made against the film.

Hanna K. opened in several American cities and played for a short time to negative reviews,  and then was abruptly pulled from circulation by the American distributor of the film. Costa Gavras personally advertised the film in The New York Times at a cost of $50,000. Universal forbade him to use ads prepared for the film.

Vincent Canby of The New York Times called it a "large, soggy dud" with ill-drawn characters and "dopey dialogue." Edward Said  said in a Village Voice review that "as a political as well as cinematic intervention, then Hanna K. is a statement of a great and, I believe, lasting significance."

Legacy
In her 1986 book Israel and the American National Interest, A Critical Examination Cheryl A. Rubenberg said that the film was a departure from the entertainment industry's traditionally sympathetic stance, as found in films and television docudramas such as Exodus, The Chosen, A Woman Called Golda, and Entebbe.

References

External links
 
 
 

1983 films
English-language French films
English-language Israeli films
1983 drama films
Films directed by Costa Gavras
Israeli–Palestinian conflict films
Films scored by Gabriel Yared
French drama films
Israeli drama films
1980s English-language films
1980s French films